Sheffield Lock, at , is a lock on the Kennet and Avon Canal, in the civil parish of Burghfield in the English county of Berkshire. It is also sometimes known as Shenfield Lock.

Sheffield Lock was built between 1718 and 1723 under the supervision of the engineer John Hore of Newbury, and this stretch of the river is now administered by the Canal & River Trust as part of the Kennet Navigation.

The lock was built in the early 18th century and was originally turf-sided. It was enlarged in the mid 18th century to cope with larger "Newbury barges" and has 20th century alterations. It consists of brick chamber walls of 11 scalloped bays, with brick coping and has 2 sets of double wooden gates, all with mechanical gate paddle gearing. The lock is Grade II listed, and a scheduled monument.

References

See also

Locks on the Kennet and Avon Canal

Grade II listed buildings in Berkshire
Locks of Berkshire
Locks on the Kennet and Avon Canal
West Berkshire District
Scheduled monuments in Berkshire
Grade II* listed canals
1723 establishments in England
Buildings and structures completed in 1723